Anton Konovalov (born 18 January 1985) is a Russian former alpine skier who competed in the 2006 Winter Olympics.

External links
 sports-reference.com

1985 births
Living people
Russian male alpine skiers
Olympic alpine skiers of Russia
Alpine skiers at the 2006 Winter Olympics
Universiade medalists in alpine skiing
Universiade bronze medalists for Russia
Competitors at the 2005 Winter Universiade